The Durkin Opening (also known as the Durkin Attack or the Sodium Attack) is a rarely played chess opening.

1. Na3

The Durkin Opening is named for Robert T. Durkin (1923–2014) of New Jersey. The name "Sodium Attack" comes from the algebraic notation 1.Na3, as Na is the chemical symbol for the element sodium. Similarly, the Amar Opening (1.Nh3) is sometimes referred to as the "Ammonia Opening". White may follow up by playing c4, e.g. 1...d5 2.c4 dxc4 3.Nxc4.

Assessment
This development of the  does little to utilize White's advantage of the first move. On a3 the knight does not control  squares, and White would have to move this knight again (e.g., to c2 or c4) for it to follow common rules such as controlling the center. Angus Dunnington suggests that combining this with a gradual central expansion should give White a reasonable position.

Variations
Durkin Gambit (1.Na3 e5 2.Nc4 Nc6 3. e4 f5)

See also
 List of chess openings
 List of chess openings named after people

Footnotes

References

Chess openings